James McKee (alternately McKie, 18 March 1871 – 12 May 1949) was a Scottish footballer who played as a centre-forward for Scotland and for various clubs in Scotland and England in the 1890s and 1900s.

Football career
McKee started his football career with Heart of Midlothian before moving to England to spend one season at Darwen in 1896. He then returned to Scotland to join East Stirlingshire, and later went back to England to play for Bolton Wanderers, Luton Town and New Brompton.

His only Scotland cap came in Scotland's 5–2 win over Wales on 19 March 1898 when he scored two goals, with the others from fellow debutant, James Gillespie. Though largely raised in Shotts, McKee was born in County Down in Ireland which should have disqualified him (and England-born teammate William Watson) from being selected under the rules of the time.

References

External links
Bolton players career details

1871 births
1949 deaths
Irish association footballers (before 1923)
Scottish footballers
Heart of Midlothian F.C. players
Footballers from North Lanarkshire
Sportspeople from Shotts
Sportspeople from County Down
Darwen F.C. players
East Stirlingshire F.C. players
Scotland international footballers
Association football forwards
Bolton Wanderers F.C. players
Luton Town F.C. players
Gillingham F.C. players
Scottish Football League players
English Football League players
Southern Football League players
Dykehead F.C. players